EMR may refer to:

Companies
 Emerson Electric, an American company with NYSE symbol EMR
 European Metal Recycling, a scrap metal recycling company
 East Midlands Railway, a British train operating company
 EMR Telemetry, an American technology company
 Eastern Maine Railway, an American short line railroad.

Science and technology
 Electromagnetic radiation, a self-propagating wave in space
 Electron magnetic resonance, several forms of imaging methods
 Electro Magnetic Resonance, a Wacom technology
 Extraordinary magnetoresistance, a geometrical magnetoresistance effect

Medicine
 EGF module-containing mucin-like hormone receptor
 Electronic medical record, a medical record in digital format
 Emergency medical responder, a level of medical training below that of an emergency medical technician
 Endoscopic mucosal resection, a medical therapy with endoscopy

Other uses
 Amazon Elastic MapReduce, an Amazon EC2 service based on Hadoop
 Edmonton Metropolitan Region, a metropolitan area in Alberta, Canada
 EMR camouflage
 Excalibur: Morgana's Revenge, a 1997 computer game
 M39 Enhanced Marksman Rifle, an American sniper rifle